Rattlesnake Creek is a stream entirely within Delaware County, Ohio. It is a tributary of Big Walnut Creek.

Rattlesnake Creek was named for the frequent rattlesnakes at the rock outcroppings along its course.

See also
List of rivers of Ohio

References

Rivers of Delaware County, Ohio
Rivers of Ohio